VfB Altena is a German football club from the city of Altena, North Rhine-Westphalia. The club has spent most of its existence in lower level local play with the exception of seven seasons (1974–81) spent in third tier competition. In addition to its football side the club has departments for chess, handball, and table tennis.



History
The team was established 23 March 1912 as Verein für Bewegungsspiele Altena and was joined sometime around 1920 by the football department of Turnverein Deutsche Eiche Altena. After emerging as Landesliga Westfalen (IV) champions in 1974 they were promoted to the Amateurliga Westfalen (III), Gruppe 2. The league was reorganized into a single division in 1978 becoming the Amateuroberliga Westfalen (IV). Altena earned only lower table finishes with their best result being 9th in 1978. They were relegated after a 14th-place finish in 1981 and play today in the Kreisliga A Lüdenscheid (VIII).

Honours
 Landesliga Westfalen (IV)
 Champions: 1974

References

External links
Official team site
Das deutsche Fußball-Archiv historical German domestic league tables 

Football clubs in Germany
Football clubs in North Rhine-Westphalia
1912 establishments in Germany
Association football clubs established in 1912
Altena